Lataimari is a small village in the Nagaon district in the Indian state of Assam.

References

External links 
 
 

Villages in Nagaon district